Coes is a surname and given name which may refer to:

 Coes of Mytilene, 6th century Greek tyrant
 Ben Coes (born 1966), American novelist
 George H. Coes (1828–1897), American minstrel music performer
 Harold V. Coes (1883–1959), American industrial engineer
 Loring Coes (1812–1906), American inventor of the monkey wrench, industrialist and politician